The Women's 200 metre individual medley competition of the 2014 European Aquatics Championships was held on 20–21 August.

Records
Prior to the competition, the existing world, European and championship records were as follows.

Results

Heats
The heats were held at 09:45.

Semifinals
The semifinals were held at 18:35.

Semifinal 1

Semifinal 2

Final
The final was held at 18:18.

References

Women's 200 metre individual medley